Neocollyris convergentefrontalis is a species of ground beetle in the genus Neocollyris in the family Carabidae. It was described by Horn in 1923.

References

Convergentefrontalis, Neocollyris
Beetles described in 1923